Laeviemarginula is a genus of sea snails, marine gastropod mollusks in the family Fissurellidae, the keyhole limpets and slit limpets.

Species
Species within the genus Laeviemarginula include:
Laeviemarginula kimberti (Cotton, 1930)

The following species were brought into synonymy:
 Laeviemarginula membranacea Habe, 1953: synonym of Laeviemarginula kimberti (Cotton, 1930)

References

External links
 To World Register of Marine Species

Fissurellidae
Monotypic gastropod genera